Phu Phan National Park is a national park in Sakon Nakhon and Kalasin provinces, Thailand. This isolated park covers a wide jungle area in the Phu Phan Mountains of Isan.

Geography
The park's area is 415,439 rai ~ .

History
In the past, the isolation of the park's location led to its use for cover by some military groups. During World War II, the Seri Thai resistance fighters used the Tham Seri Thai cave for weapons storage. And in the 1970s the People's Liberation Army of Thailand (PLAT) used the area as a hideout.

Attractions
Viewpoints in the park include the west-facing Nang Mern Cliff and the Lan Sao Aee plateau.

The park has numerous waterfalls, including the multi-stage Kam Hom Waterfall, also Kreng Ka-arm and Pree-cha Suk-san waterfalls.

The park also contains the ruins of a Khmer temple, Phra That Phu Pek, accessed by ascending around 500 steps.

Flora and fauna
The park consists of seasonal tropical forest, with a large dry dipterocarp forest component. Other forest tree types here are dry evergreen and mixed deciduous. Tree species include Dalbergia cochinchinensis, Pterocarpus macrocarpus, Shorea roxburghii, Afzelia xylocarpa, Hopea odorata, Dipterocarpus alatus, Dipterocarpus obtusifolius, Dipterocarpus tuberculatus, Shorea obtusa, Terminalia alata, Irvingia malayana, Shorea siamensis, Lagerstroemia calyculata, Tetrameles nudiflora, Xylia xylocarpa Peltophorum dasyrhachis and Dillenia obovata.

Animal species include tiger, Phayre's leaf monkey, sambar deer, fishing cat, Sunda flying lemur, Malayan porcupine, common palm civet, northern red muntjac and wild boar. Bird species include black drongo, hill myna, Richard's pipit and white-rumped shama.

See also
List of national parks of Thailand
List of Protected Areas Regional Offices of Thailand

References

National parks of Thailand
Geography of Kalasin province
Tourist attractions in Kalasin province
Geography of Sakon Nakhon province
Tourist attractions in Sakon Nakhon province
1982 establishments in Thailand
Protected areas established in 1982